Rana Mannan Khanis a Pakistani politician who has had been a Member of the Provincial Assembly of the Punjab from August 2018 till January 2023. Previously he was a member of the Punjab Assembly from May 2013 to May 2018.

Early life and education
He was born on 1 October 1976 in Sialkot.

He has a degree of Bachelor of Art which he received in 1996 from University of the Punjab.

Political career

He was elected to the Provincial Assembly of the Punjab as a candidate of Pakistan Muslim League (Nawaz) (PML-N) from Constituency PP-134 (Narowal-III) in 2013 Pakistani general election.

He was re-elected to Provincial Assembly of the Punjab as a candidate of PML-N from Constituency PP-48 (Narowal-III) in 2018 Pakistani general election.

References

Living people
Punjab MPAs 2013–2018
1976 births
Pakistan Muslim League (N) MPAs (Punjab)
Punjab MPAs 2018–2023
University of the Punjab alumni
Politicians from Sialkot